Ronil Kumar (born 29 November 1984) is a Fijian retired footballer and manager.

He played as a midfielder for Fiji national football team, Fijian team Ba F.C., New Zealand club Waitakere United, and for New Zealander Waitakere City.

International career
Kumar made his debut for Fiji at the South Pacific Games 2007 and he has played for them in the 2010 FIFA World Cup qualification tournament.

Personal life 
Ronil is the brother of Salesh, also football international for Fiji.

References

External links
 Player profile - Waitakere Utd club website
 
 2007/2008 season stats - NZFC
 

Living people
1984 births
Fijian footballers
Fiji international footballers
Fijian expatriate footballers
Ba F.C. players
Waitakere City FC players
Waitakere United players
2008 OFC Nations Cup players
Expatriate association footballers in New Zealand
Fijian expatriate sportspeople in New Zealand
Fijian people of Indian descent
Association football midfielders